Nils Ludvig Fritzson is a Swedish footballer for IF Brommapojkarna, who plays as an attacking midfielder.

Career
Born in Mölltorp, Fritzson began his career in the youth team of his local team Mölltorp/Breviks before making his senior debut at Tibro AIK. After impressing in the lower leagues for Tibro, he attracted the attention of Superettan side Degerfors IF. In two seasons he scored 9 goals in 50 games, and subsequently attracted the attention of Östersunds FK in the Allsvenskan. In his first season at the club, he played 13 games, scoring twice, including the winner against IFK Göteborg.

References

1995 births
Living people
Allsvenskan players
Östersunds FK players
Association football midfielders
Swedish footballers
Degerfors IF players